Prince of the Poverty Line is the fourth full-length studio album by British folk metal band Skyclad. It is a loose concept album about urban decay in post-Thatcherite Britain.

According to Kevin Ridley, producer and, from 1997, a full band-member, this album remains their biggest seller. Many people consider it to be the band's masterwork.

Track listing
 "Civil War Dance" – 5:03
 "Cardboard City" – 5:05
 "Sins of Emission" – 3:33
 "Land of the Rising Slum" – 4:28
 "The One Piece Puzzle" – 5:52
 "A Bellyful of Emptiness" – 4:57
 "A Dog in the Manger" – 6:10
 "Gammadion Seed" – 5:26
 "Womb of the Worm" – 6:56
 "The Truth Famine" – 4:30
 "Brothers Beneath the Skin" (Limited edition bonus track) - 3:45

The US edition of the album contains the studio tracks from the Skyclad EP Tracks from the Wilderness as alternate bonus tracks, including the Thin Lizzy cover, "Emerald":
 "Emerald" – 3:34 (Gorham/Downey/Robertson/Lynott)
 "A Room Next Door" – 4:51
 "When All Else Fails" – 4:19

All Songs Written By Ramsey/Walkyier unless otherwise noted

Production
Produced By Kevin Ridley & Skyclad
Engineered & Mixed By Kevin Ridley

Personnel
Martin Walkyier: Lead Vocals
Steve Ramsey: Six & Twelve String Guitars, Backing Vocals
Dave Pugh: Electric & Acoustic Guitars
Cath Howell: Keyboards, Violin, Backing Vocals
Graeme English: Bass, Backing Vocals
Keith Baxter: Drums
With-Tony Bray, Steve Chahley, Graig Dodds, Mark Dodds, Alex Martin: Additional Backing Vocals

1994 albums
Skyclad (band) albums
Noise Records albums
Concept albums
Albums produced by Kevin Ridley